The Deputy Chief Minister Of Maharashtra is the deputy head of the executive branch of the Government of Maharashtra and the second highest ranking minister of the Council of Ministers.

List of deputy chief ministers

See also
List of governors of Maharashtra
List of chief ministers of Maharashtra
List of Chairman of the Maharashtra Legislative Council
List of speakers of the Maharashtra Legislative Assembly
List of Deputy Speakers of the Maharashtra Legislative Assembly

List of Leader of the House of the Maharashtra Legislative Assembly
List of Leaders of the House of the Maharashtra Legislative Council
 List of Deputy Leader of the House of the Maharashtra Legislative Assembly

List of Leader of the Opposition of the Maharashtra Legislative Assembly
List of Leader of the Opposition of the Maharashtra Legislative Council
 Chief Ministers of India

References

deputy chief ministers
Maharashtra